6-APA ((+)-6-aminopenicillanic acid) is a chemical compound used as an intermediate in the synthesis of β–lactam antibiotics. The major commercial source of 6-APA is still natural penicillin G: the semi-synthetic penicillins derived from 6-APA are also referred to as penicillins and are considered part of the penicillin family of antibiotics. 

In 1958, Beecham scientists from Brockham Park, Surrey, found a way to obtain 6-APA from penicillin. Other β-lactam antibiotics could then be synthesized by attaching  various side-chains to the nucleus. The reason why this was achieved so many years after the commercial development of penicillin by Howard Florey and Ernst Chain lies in the fact that penicillin itself is very susceptible to hydrolysis, so direct replacement of the side-chain was not a practical route to other β-lactam antibiotics.

References

Beta-lactam antibiotics
Sulfur heterocycles
Amines